On the Mouth is the third studio album by American indie rock band Superchunk. The album was recorded September 14–20, 1992, at West Beach Studios, engineered by Donnell Cameron, and produced by John Reis and Superchunk. It was released by Matador Records in 1993.

On the Mouth marked the debut of drummer Jon Wurster, who replaced Chuck "Chunk" Garrison.

The band also has a song called "On the Mouth," but it is not on this album.  It first appeared as b-side for the single version of "Mower."

American alternative rock band Jimmy Eat World covered "Precision Auto" for its 2010 album Invented. Fucked Up and Tom Scharpling, of Scharpling and Wurster fame, covered "Precision Auto" at the Matador at 21 festival in Las Vegas. Post-punk band Les Savy Fav covered "Precision Auto" on "Score! 20 Years of Merge Records: The Covers!"

Track listing
 "Precision Auto" – 2:46
 "From the Curve" – 3:18
 "For Tension" – 2:59
 "Mower" – 3:45
 "Package Thief" – 2:28
 "Swallow That" – 6:14
 "I Guess I Remembered It Wrong" – 3:33
 "New Low" – 3:20
 "Untied" – 4:12
 "The Question is How Fast" – 4:06
 "Trash Heap" – 3:25
 "Flawless" – 2:33
 "The Only Piece That You Get" – 2:41

References

1993 albums
Superchunk albums
Matador Records albums